Cosmos is an album by jazz composer, bandleader and keyboardist Sun Ra and his Arkestra recorded in France in 1976 and originally released on the French Cobra label in Europe and on Inner City Records in the US.

Reception
The Allmusic review by Ron Wynn awarded the album 4 stars stating "Sun Ra provided some stunning moments on the Rocksichord, while leading The Arkestra through stomping full-band cuts of atmospheric or alternately hard bop compositions, peeling off various saxophonists for skittering, screaming, at times spacey dialogues".

Track listing
All compositions by Sun Ra
 "The Mystery of Two" - 5:51   
 "Interstellar Low Ways" - 5:23   
 "Neo Project #2" - 5:04   
 "Cosmos" - 2:58   
 "Moonship Journey" - 6:17   
 "Journey Among the Stars" - 5:13   
 "Jazz from an Unknown Planet" - 7:10

Personnel
Sun Ra - Rocksichord 
John Gilmore - tenor saxophone
Marshall Allen, Danny Davis - alto saxophone, flute
Danny Ray Thompson - baritone saxophone, flute
Eloe Omoe - bass clarinet, flute
Jac Jacson - bassoon, flute
Ahmed Abdullah  - trumpet 
Vincent Chancey - French horn
Craig Harris - trombone
R. Anthony Bunn - electric bass
Larry Bright - drums

References 

Sun Ra albums
Inner City Records albums
1977 albums